Karunagaran Ekambaram (born 6 June 1954) is an Indian weightlifter. He competed in the men's flyweight event at the 1980 Summer Olympics.

References

1954 births
Living people
Indian male weightlifters
Olympic weightlifters of India
Weightlifters at the 1980 Summer Olympics
Place of birth missing (living people)
20th-century Indian people